State Route 269 (SR 269) is a primary state highway in the U.S. state of Virginia. Known as Longdale Furnace Road, the state highway runs  from Interstate 64 (I-64)/U.S. Route 60 (US 60), and SR 42 near Nicelytown east to I-64/US 60 at Longdale Furnace. SR 269 forms part of the old alignment of US 60 in eastern Alleghany County.

Route description

SR 269 begins at a diamond interchange with I-64/US 60. The roadway continues north as SR 42 (Forty Two Road) through Nicelytown. SR 42 runs concurrently with SR 269 south to the former highway's southern terminus at SR 632 (Longdale Furnace Road), where SR 269 turns East on a two-lane undivided road. The state highway parallels I-64/US 60 southeast through the narrow valley of Sharvers Run to the Cowpasture River, then crosses the river and veers northeast to follow Simpson Creek. SR 269 follows the creek to the hamlet of Longdale Furnace to its eastern terminus at a diamond interchange with I-64/US 60. The roadway continues northeast beyond the interchange as SR 850 (North Mountain Road).

Major intersections

References

External links

Virginia Highways Project: VA 269

269
State Route 269
U.S. Route 60